Partido Revolución Organizada (lit. Organized Revolution Party) was a political party in formation in Guatemala.

History
The party was established in 2017 by Dulce Alejandra Ávila Barrascout. It has 18,000 affiliates. The first public act was in May 2018. Its formation process ends in 2019, due to this the political party is not qualified to participate in the general elections of 2019.

References

External links

2017 establishments in Guatemala
2019 disestablishments in Guatemala
Centrist parties in North America
Defunct political parties in Guatemala
Political parties disestablished in 2019
Political parties established in 2017